Taylorsville is a town in Alexander County, North Carolina, United States. The population was 2,098 at the 2010 census. It is the county seat of Alexander County.

Taylorsville is part of the Hickory–Lenoir–Morganton Metropolitan Statistical Area.

History
The town of Taylorsville was formed in 1847 along with Alexander County. A commission of William Dula of Caldwell County, Dr. James Calloway of Wilkes County, Milton Campbell of Iredell County, and Robert Allen, Reuben Watts and Robert L. Steel of Alexander County were named to select a site as near the center of the county as possible for the seat of justice. The town was named Taylorsville in honor of General Zachary Taylor who at that time was in Mexico engaged in the Mexican–American War.

The land for the town was donated by J.M. Bogle who gave , William Matheson who gave  and James James who gave 11 acres for a total of 46 acres. Most of the land was woodland, and the road from Statesville to Morganton passed to the south of town.

A commission of Alexander C. McIntosh, R.L. Steel, Sion Harrington, J.H. Newland, and George Swain, treasurer, were appointed to lay out the town of Taylorsville and sell lots to raise money for the building of a courthouse and jail. An auction of lots was held August 11, 1847, and 47 lots were sold. The second sale was November 30, 1847, and 10 lots were sold. At a third auction on March 8, 1848, five lots were sold. The total amounted to $6,674.75.

The town of Taylorsville was incorporated in 1851. The first mayor was John Watts and was appointed by the commissioners. The boundaries of the incorporated town were square, with each side 160 poles or one-half mile long.

Geography

Demographics

2020 census

As of the 2020 United States census, there were 2,320 people, 927 households, and 573 families residing in the town.

2000 census
As of the census of 2000, there were 1,798 people, 746 households, and 446 families residing in the town. The population density was 897.6 people per square mile (347.3/km2). There were 819 housing units at an average density of 408.6 per square mile (158.1/km2). The racial makeup of the town was 82.71% White, 11.40% African American, 0.11% Native American, 1.06% Asian, 3.50% from other races, and 1.22% from two or more races. Hispanic or Latino of any race were 6.17% of the population.

There were 746 households, out of which 25.1% had children under the age of 18 living with them, 39.9% were married couples living together, 14.9% had a female householder with no husband present, and 40.1% were non-families. 35.8% of all households were made up of individuals, and 17.7% had someone living alone who was 65 years of age or older. The average household size was 2.20 and the average family size was 2.83.

In the town, the population was spread out, with 20.6% under the age of 18, 7.9% from 18 to 24, 25.8% from 25 to 44, 20.3% from 45 to 64, and 25.3% who were 65 years of age or older. The median age was 41 years. For every 100 females, there were 84.9 males. For every 100 females age 18 and over, there were 77.5 males.

The median income for a household in the town was $24,875, and the median income for a family was $34,063. Males had a median income of $29,737 versus $20,135 for females. The per capita income for the town was $14,876. About 12.7% of families and 21.3% of the population were below the poverty line, including 26.8% of those under age 18 and 21.2% of those age 65 or over.

Education
The students of Taylorsville are served by the Alexander County Schools district. There are two high schools in the district, Alexander Central High School and Alexander Early College, both of which are located in the town.  However, 9% of students at Challenger Early College High School (a public high school in Hickory, North Carolina operated by Catawba County Schools) reside in Alexander County.

Notable people
 Charles E. Allen, former Undersecretary for Intelligence and Analysis at the US Department of Homeland Security
 Henlee Hulix Barnette, American social activist and professor of Christian ethics
 Harry Deal and the Galaxies, longtime "beach music" band
 Harry Gant, former NASCAR Cup Series driver
 Romulus Z. Linney, U.S. congressman from 1895–1901
 Jim Poole, MLB first baseman
 Jerry Rushing, bootlegger and inspiration for The Dukes of Hazzard
 Guppy Troup, former professional ten-pin bowler
 Kyle Troup, professional ten-pin bowler
 Onur Tukel, filmmaker
 William Vanderbloemen, entrepreneur, pastor, speaker, and author
 Rex White, former NASCAR Grand National Division (now Cup Series) champion

See also
 Taylorsville Times

References

External links

Towns in Alexander County, North Carolina
County seats in North Carolina
Populated places established in 1847